Contribution is the second studio album by British singer-songwriter Mica Paris, released on 20 October 1990 by 4th & B'way Records and Island Records. It includes three singles which reached the UK Singles Chart: "Contribution" (No. 33), "South of the River" (No. 50) and "If I Love U 2 Nite" (No. 43).

Reception
Lynn Norment in EBONY described 'Paris' musical style is a combination of sultry soul and street-wise funk. Among her most enjoyable tunes are the title song, "Contribution", "South of the River," and "Truth and Honesty."

Track listing

Charts

Certifications

References

1990 albums
Mica Paris albums
Island Records albums
Freestyle music albums